Slagsmålsklubben (often abbreviated as SMK) was a Swedish electronic music group from Norrköping, Östergötland. The group's name is a comically literal Swedish translation of the title of the novel and film Fight Club by Chuck Palahniuk. They have released five studio albums so far. Along with their side projects 50 Hertz and Häxor och porr (Witches and Porn), they were featured on Björk's 2005 remix album Army of Me: Remixes and Covers.

SMK's members are Björn Anders Nilsson, Hannes Stenström, Joakim "Beebop" Nybom, Joni Mälkki, Kim Nilsson and Frej Larsson. The members of the band have many side projects, such as 50 Hertz, which features many of SMK's members, Din Stalker, Hannes' solo project, and Offerprästers orkester, one of Frej's solo projects.

In 2005, the entire band moved to Berlin. As of 2011, all members have returned to Stockholm, and now share a mansion together with an on-site recording studio where they have recorded and mastered their fourth studio album, The Garage.

History
Slagsmålsklubben was formed on 2 November 2000 in Norrköping, Sweden by Joakim "Beebop" Nybom, Björn Anders Nilsson and Joni Mälkki, former members of the punk rock band The Solbrillers.

The idea of forming a synthpop band occurred to them at a band practice with The Solbrillers. Since the singer of the band wouldn't show up, they decided to plug in Joni's old synthesizer into his guitar amplifier. The three recorded a few songs, which eventually led to the forming of SMK.

Hannes Stenström joined the band one year later, in 2001, because he had good synthesizers. Frej Larsson joined the band in 2003 after they had made the 7" Hyreshusklossar together and in 2004 Kim Nilsson joined the band, finalizing their current line-up.

Discography

Studio albums
 Den svenske disco (2003)
 Sagan om konungens årsinkomst (2004)
 Boss for Leader (2007)
 The Garage (2012)

EPs
 "Hit Me Hard" (2004)
 "Den Officiella Os-Låten" (2004)
 "His Morning Promenade" (2005)
 "Malmö Beach Night Party" (2007)
 "Brutal Weapons" (2009)
 "Jake Blood" (2012)
 "Snälla TV Plz" (2012)

Other albums
 Fest I Valen
 Live in Rødby
 LittleBigPlanet Vita Soundtrack

Appearances

External links
  
  Official fanclub 
 
 

EMI Records artists
Musical groups established in 2000
Swedish synthpop groups